Stewart James (May 14, 1908 – November 5, 1996) was a Canadian postman who became one of magic's most prolific inventors. He spent most of his life in Courtright, Ontario.

Biography 
Stewart James was highly respected for his creativity and invention of magic tricks; inventions of James's are used by many magicians despite his low name recognition Martin Gardner described him as "a magician who has probably devised more high-quality mathematical card tricks than anyone who ever lived".

Books 
 One More Thought on Cards (1955)
 Compiled and edited the Abbott Encyclopedia of Rope Tricks
 Abbott's Encyclopedia of Rope Tricks, Vol. 1 (1941)
 Abbott's Encyclopedia of Rope Tricks, Vol. 2 (1968)
 Abbott's Encyclopedia of Rope Tricks, Vol. 3 (1980)
 Stewart James in Print: The First 50 Years (1989), edited by P. Howard Lyons and Allan Slaight 
 The James File, Vol. 1 and 2 (2000) by Allan Slaight, contains nearly 1700 pages of Stewart James's magic.
 The Essential Stewart James (2007)

Awards 
 The Academy of Magical Arts Creative Fellowship (1981)

References

Further reading
 James Bibliography, Ibidem #22 (October 1960), and reprinted in Ibidem, Vol. 2 (2001).
 Cover Linking Ring, November 1990.
 Cover Genii 1991 March
 Obit - Genii 1996 November
 The Life and Magic of Stewart James online exhibition
 David Ben post on Genii

20th-century Canadian inventors
1908 births
1996 deaths
Canadian magicians
People from Lambton County
Academy of Magical Arts Creative Fellowship winners